Almami Rural LLG is a local-level government (LLG) of Madang Province, Papua New Guinea.

Wards
01. Ambana
02. Lilau (Lilau language speakers)
03. Gawat
04. Wangor
05. Suaru
06. Dumudum
07. Turutapa
08. Urumarav
09. Milalimuda
10. Aidibal
11. Turupuav
12. Murusapa
13. Wadaginam
14. Sirikin
15. Wagimuda
16. Yavera
17. Yakiba
18. Mugumat
19. Yoro Suvat
20. Dugumor
21. Busip Kalelap
22. Simbine
23. Malala Wakor (Mauwake language speakers)
24. Amiten
25. Aketa
26. Aleswaw
27. Manugar
28. Gugubar
29. Erewanem
30. Ulatapun
31. Tarikapa
32. Muaka
33. Korak (Korak language speakers)
34. Ulingan (Mauwake language speakers)
35. Toto
36. Medebur
37. Mereman Mereman

References

Local-level governments of Madang Province